Dastan Jumabekov (Kyrgyz: Дастан Жумабеков; born 2 November 1976) is a Kyrgyz politician who has served as Speaker of the Supreme Council of Kyrgyzstan, the country’s parliament, since his appointment on October 25, 2017. He was elected Speaker with a vote of 80-30 MPs, succeeding the outgoing Chynybaĭ Tursunbekov, who had stepped down to “preserve stability in the country”.

He was born 2 November 1976, in 2001 he graduated from the Kyrgyz National University with a degree in law.

References

Chairmen of the Supreme Council (Kyrgyzstan)
1976 births
Living people
Kyrgyz National University alumni